The Confederation Park subdivision of Saskatoon, Saskatchewan, Canada, is located west of the South Saskatchewan River, Saskatoon's west side.

History
The community first appeared on city maps in the late 1960s, with development commencing in the early 1970s. Most street names in the community are those of prominent politicians in Canadian history, primarily prime ministers, though others, including governors-general have also been recognized. Full build-out of the neighbourhood did not occur until the mid-2000s with the construction of one final street, Blakeney Crescent, honoring former Saskatchewan premier Allan Blakeney. In 2012, a small extension to the community was indicated as part of the area concept plan for the neighboring new area of Kensington, involving a short extension of Steeves Avenue to connect with a realigned 33rd Street. This will presumably facilitate the construction of a small number of additional dwellings.

Geography
The suburb is fashioned around Parc Canada, a  park area comprising Bishop Roberecki School and Confederation Park School. The northern boundary is 33rd Street West and the eastern is Confederation Drive. The southern boundary is Laurier & Diefenbaker Drives. To the west of Confederation Park is Kensington.

Demographics
In 2006, the neighbourhood consisted of 6,324 residents with an average family income of $50,210. At this time, the average household was valued at $143,142, and 72.7% of the population owned their own home. The average household size was 2.9.
In 2019, Confederation Park was home to 7,347 people, with an average personal income of $36,210. At this time, 71.9% of the population owned their own home. The average household size was 3.

According to the City of Saskatoon Planning and Development, the average sale price of a home as of 2021 was $236,616.

Government and politics
Confederation Park exists within the federal electoral district of Saskatoon West. It is currently represented by Brad Redekopp of the Conservative Party of Canada, first elected in 2019.

Provincially, the area is within the constituency of Saskatoon Fairview. It is currently represented by Vicki Mowat of the Saskatchewan New Democratic Party, first elected in a 2017 by-election.

In Saskatoon's non-partisan municipal politics, Confederation Park lies within ward 3. It is currently represented by Ann Iwanchuk, first elected in 2011.

Education

 Bishop Roborecki School is a separate elementary school.
 Wâhkôhtowin School is a public elementary school providing education for grade levels K to 8, approximately ages 5 to 13.

Street names
With the exception of 33rd Street, the roadways are mainly named after prominent prime ministers, premiers, and fathers of confederation.

References 
Bill Barry, Geographic Names of Saskatchewan (Regina: People Places Publishing, 2005)

Notes

External links

City of Saskatoon · Departments · Community Services · City Planning · ZAM Maps
Populace Spring 2006
City of Saskatoon - Local Area Plans

Neighbourhoods in Saskatoon